The Hiroshima Peace Memorial Museum is a museum located in Hiroshima Peace Memorial Park, in central Hiroshima, Japan, dedicated to documenting the atomic bombing of Hiroshima in World War II.

The museum was established in August 1955 with the Hiroshima Peace Memorial Hall (now the ). It is the most popular of Hiroshima's destinations for school field-trips from all over Japan and for international visitors. 53 million people had visited the museum from its opening in 1955 through 2005, averaging over one million visitors per year. The architect of the main building was Kenzō Tange.

Museum content

According to the introduction in the Hiroshima Peace Memorial Museum's English guide: 
"The Peace Memorial Museum collects and displays belongings left by the victims, photos, and other materials that convey the horror of that event, supplemented by exhibits that describe Hiroshima before and after the bombings and others that present the current status of the nuclear age. Each of the items displayed embodies the grief, anger, or pain of real people. Having now recovered from the A-bomb calamity, Hiroshima's deepest wish is the elimination of all nuclear weapons and the realization of a genuinely peaceful international community."

To facilitate education, the museum was renovated in 1994 and was now divided into two sections.

The East Wing—the newest addition—explained the history of Hiroshima City before the bomb, development and decision to drop the bomb, the lives of Hiroshima citizens during World War II and after the bombing, and ended with information about the nuclear age and efforts for international peace. Included in this section was a model showing the damage done to the city. It had some important letters exchanged between scientists and top leaders of that era talking about atomic development and predicted result of its use.

The West Wing, which was part of the old museum, concentrated on the damage of the bomb.  Sections included Material Witness, which showed clothing, watches, hair, and other personal effects worn by victims of the bomb; Damage by the Heat Rays, a section that looked at what happened to wood, stone, metal, glass, and flesh from the heat; Damage by the Blast, focusing on the destruction caused by the after shocks of the blast, and Damage by the Radiation which went into detail about the health effects suffered by humans.

The museum began major renovations in 2014. The East Wing reopened in April 2017, featuring more interactive displays and replacing the model of the city with a new version that uses projection mapping to demonstrate the effects of the bomb blast. When the East Wing reopened, the Main Hall was closed for seismic retrofitting until 25 April 2019. The exhibits were also renovated during this time to focus more on victim's belongings, and are now divided into four sections: an introductory exhibit in the East Wing, "Reality of the Atomic Bombing" and a gallery in the Main Building, "Dangers of Nuclear Weapons" in the East Wing, and "Hiroshima History" in the East Wing.

List of notable visitors

Gallery

See also
 Atomic bombings of Hiroshima and Nagasaki
 Hiroshima Peace Memorial
 Hiroshima Witness – 1986 documentary film
 Nagasaki Atomic Bomb Museum
 Nagasaki National Peace Memorial Hall for the Atomic Bomb Victims
 Nagasaki Peace Park
 Sadako Sasaki
 Human Shadow Etched in Stone - one of the exhibitions at the museum

References

External links

 
 Hiroshima National Peace Memorial Hall for the Atomic Bomb Victims 
 Hiroshima Peace Memorial Museum @ architecture in Hiroshima 
 Hiroshima Archive
 

1955 establishments in Japan
Monuments and memorials concerning the atomic bombings of Hiroshima and Nagasaki
Modernist architecture in Japan
Museums established in 1955
Museums in Hiroshima
Peace museums
World War II museums in Japan